The Landesbank der Rheinprovinz or Rheinische Landesbank was a German provincial public bank or Landesbank, whose origins go back to the Rheinische Provinzial-Hülfskasse established 1854 in the Rhine Province of Prussia. Following uncontrolled expansion in the 1920s, it collapsed in 1931, shortly after Austria's Creditanstalt and before Danatbank, thus contributing materially to the European banking crisis of 1931.

The Landesbank der Rheinprovinz was a direct predecessor entity of Westdeutsche Landesbank (WestLB), which had its head office in Düsseldorf on the same grounds where the Rheinische Landesbank had been established. WestLB in turn collapsed in 2007–2008 after uncontrolled balance sheet expansion, in an echo of the previous episode of 1931.

Rheinische Provinzial-Hülfskasse

Its mandate was not about making profits but "supporting institutions, municipal buildings or commercial companies with loans, paying off municipal debts, and promoting the savings bank system through centralized management of savings."

The Provincial Parliament of the Rhine Province took charge of oversight of the Rheinische Provinzial-Hülfskasse in September 1871. As a consequence, on  the fund's head office was relocated from Cologne to the parliament's seat in Düsseldorf, against the will of the fund's directors who preferred Cologne as a more vibrant financial center at the time.

Landesbank der Rheinprovinz

In February 1888, the Rheinische Provinzial-Hülfskasse was renamed the Landesbank der Rheinprovinz. On , the Landesbank opened a branch in Cologne.

In the 1920s, the Landesbank, led by Hu­bert Bel and August Ber­negau, expanded dramatically by aggressively lending to municipalities with few internal controls and insufficient capital. As a consequence, it collapse in mid-1931 when the financial environment became unfavorable. German interior ministry official  identified the Landesbank's alarming financial position during an on-site inspection in mid-June 1931, but that was too late to prevent disaster.

Aftermath

That branch took over staff of the former Landesbank and received liquidity support of 100 million Reichsmarks from the Reichsbank, which it largely passed on to savings banks. In April 1935, the business was in turn transferred to the newly formed , of which Butschkau would become chairman in 1945.

See also
 Landesbank

Notes

Defunct banks of Germany
Landesbanks